Noobees is an esports teen drama television series filmed entirely in Bogota, Colombia and produced by Viacom International Studios, and MediaPro Studios. The series premiered on Nickelodeon worldwide, except for United States, on 17 September 2018, followed by its debut in Colombia on RCN Televisión on 6 October. The series had been renewed for a second season, released in March 2020. The series stars Michelle Olvera, best known for her character in the Telemundo series La Doña.

Synopsis 
NooBees revolves around the trajectory of a group of teenagers who have the opportunity to fulfill their biggest dream: participate in the Esports Championship. For this they create "NooBees", an esports team that will compete for the title of Professional Video Games League.

Series overview

Cast

Introduced in season 1 
 Michelle Olvera as Silvia Rojas (seasons 1-2)
 Andrés de la Mora as David Ortuz (seasons 1-2)
 María Jose Vargas as Ruth Olivera "Ruthilika" (seasons 1-2)
 Lion Bagnis as Matt Montero "Míster M"
 Ilenia Antonini as Tania Botero
 Kevin Bury as Pablo Botero
 Brandon Figueredo as Erick Rojas (seasons 1-2)
 Clara Tiezzi as Laura Calles (seasons 1-2)
 Karol Saavedra as Roberta Barrios (season 1; guest season 2)
 Megumi Hasebe as Liliana "Lili" (seasons 1-2)
 Andy Munera as Nicholas "Niko" (seasons 1-2)
 Felipe Arcila as Kevin Orlando Núñez Gómez "Kong" (seasons 1-2)
 Camila Pabón as Norah (seasons 1-2)
 Luis Fernando Salas as Héctor Rojas (seasons 1-2)
 Pipe Arcila Buitrago as Kong
 Óscar Rodo as Roberto Barrios (season 1; guest season 2)
 Nara Gutiérrez as Marina Gómez (seasons 1-2)
 Karen Martínez as Salma de Rojas (seasons 1-2)
 Lugo Duarte as Mateo Montero (seasons 1-2)
 Marisol Correa as Emma de Montero
 Julian Rojas as Game Over (Voice) (seasons 1-2)
 Daniela Velez as Helen Santiago (season 1; guest season 2)
 Sergio Herrera as Rufino (seasons 1-2)
 Fernando Lara as Rector
 Juliana Velásquez as Soledade (season 1; guest season 2)
 Gonzalo Vivanco as Zigorisko

Introduced in season 2 
 Julián Cerati as Rocco
 Karlis Romero as Athina
 Luis Giraldo as Melvin
 Mafe Marín as Jackie
 Alejandro Hidalgo as Trueno
 Ginna Parra as Fernanda "Estrella"
 Monica Uribe as Doris Tormenta
 Pablo Rodríguez as Arturo
 Isabella Dominguez as Nina
 Daniela Perez "La Pereztroica" as Olimpia
 Juanita Molina as Kosnika
 Carlos Baéz as Kral
 Michelle Orozco as Oritzó 
 Estive Urrutia as Anoiram
 Stiven Espitia as Adoam 
 Nicolas Vargas as Sasac
 Jeisen Pacheco as Ferbat
 Camila Mora as Duna
 Daniel Moreno as Kevelek
 Alejandro Gutierrez as Enzo
 Nataly Arbelaez as Betsy
 Laila Camacho as Zilua
 Freddy Beltrán as Jurado
 Ian Valencia as Game Over (Avatar Form)

References

External links 
 

2018 Colombian television series debuts
Spanish-language television shows
2010s teen drama television series
Television series about computing
Nickelodeon telenovelas
2018 telenovelas
2020 telenovelas
Television series about teenagers
Teen telenovelas